The Blue Fox is a 1938 German comedy film directed by Viktor Tourjansky and starring Zarah Leander, Willy Birgel and Paul Hörbiger. It was based on a play by the Hungarian writer Ferenc Herczeg. It includes the song Kann denn Liebe Sünde sein.

It was shot at the Babelsberg Studios in Potsdam and on location in Budapest. The film's sets were designed by the art director Werner Schlichting.

Synopsis
Tired by her husband's lack of interest in her, due to his obsessive focus on his scientific study of fish, a Budapest woman flirts with the idea of running off with another man.

Cast
 Zarah Leander as Ilona Paulus
 Willy Birgel as Tabor Vary
 Paul Hörbiger as Stephan Paulus
 Jane Tilden as Lisi
 Karl Schönböck as Trill
 Rudolf Platte as Coachman Bela
 Eduard Wenck as Signalman Ürem
 Edith Meinhard as Tilla
 Gertrud de Lalsky as Professorengattin
 Erich Dunskus as Tankstellenwart
 Olga Engl as Ilonas Tante Margit
 Lothar Geist as Tankstellenlehrling
 Max Hiller as Ungarischer Bauer am Bahnhof
 Antonie Jaeckel as Die Frau Rektor
 Eva Klein-Donath as Professorengattin
 Ingolf Kuntze as Direktor des Trocadero
 Majan Lex as Anuschka, Magd bei Tante Margit
 Friedel Müller as Professorengattin
 Erich Nadler as Spielleiter im Trocadero
 Paul Rehkopf as Ungarischer Bauer
 Berta Scheven as Frau des Bahnwärters
 Franz von Bokay as Josy, Diener bei Tante Margit

References

Bibliography

External links 
 

1938 films
Films of Nazi Germany
German comedy films
1938 comedy films
1930s German-language films
Films directed by Victor Tourjansky
German films based on plays
Films based on works by Ferenc Herczeg
Films set in Budapest
German black-and-white films
UFA GmbH films
Films with screenplays by Karl Georg Külb
Films shot at Babelsberg Studios
1930s German films